The 2002 Minnesota Senate election was held in the U.S. state of Minnesota on November 5, 2002, to elect members to the Senate of the 83rd and 84th Minnesota Legislatures. A primary election was held on September 10, 2002.

The Minnesota Democratic–Farmer–Labor Party (DFL) won a majority of seats, remaining the majority party, followed by the Republican Party of Minnesota. The new Legislature convened on January 7, 2003.

Results

See also
 Minnesota House of Representatives election, 2002
 Minnesota gubernatorial election, 2002

References

2002 Minnesota elections
Minnesota Senate
Minnesota Senate elections